The Belizean Coast mangroves ecoregion covers the brackish and salt-water habitats along the Caribbean Sea coast of Belize, and of Amatique Bay in Guatemala; small parts in the border with Mexico are also present on this ecoregion. The mangroves are partially protected from the open sea by the Belize Barrier Reef, and this ecoregion is distinct from the reef-based Belizean Reef mangroves ecoregion offshore. There is a large population of the vulnerable West Indian manatee (Trichechus manatus) in the area.   It covers an area of around 2850 km2.

Location and description
The disconnected units of the ecoregion extend from the Mexico-Belize border in the north, to Amatique Bay on the southern coast of Guatemala.  There are different types of mangrove swamps, depending on the site characteristics: river estuary (such as the Monkey River), lagoons, island atolls, and coastal forest.  Technically, Belize City itself is in a mangrove area.

Offshore islands supporting mangroves include Ambergris Caye, the largest island of Belize, and the atoll reefs of Banco Chinchorro and Turneffe Atoll.

Climate
The climate of the ecoregion is Tropical savanna climate - dry winter (Köppen climate classification (Aw)). This climate is characterized by relatively even temperatures throughout the year, and a pronounced dry season.

Flora and fauna
The common mangrove tree species of the ecoregion are white mangrove (Laguncularia racemosa (generally closest to the ocean), red mangrove (Rhizophora mangle), and black mangrove (Avicennia germinans) (farther inland or upland).  Also characteristic of the area, but not specifically to mangroves, is the buttonwood tree (Conocarpus erectus).

Mammals of conservation interest include the near-threatened black howler monkey (Alouatta caraya), the critically endangered Hickatee turtle (Dermatemys mawii ), the tapir (Tapirus bairdii), the vulnerable West Indian manatee (Trichechus manatus), and Morelet's crocodile (Crocodylus moreletii).

Protected areas
Protected areas of the ecoregion include:
 Shipstern Conservation & Management Area, in Corozal District of Belize 
 Bacalar Chico National Park and Marine Reserve, on the northern part of Ambergris Island, in Belize District of Belize
 Payne's Creek National Park, in the Toledo District of southern Belize
 Sarstoon-Temash National Park, in the Toledo District of southern Belize

References

External links

Mangrove ecoregions
Ecoregions of Belize
Ecoregions of Guatemala

Ecoregions of Central America
Neotropical ecoregions